Rio Brilhante is a municipality located in the Brazilian state of Mato Grosso do Sul. Its population was 38,186 (2020) and its area is 3,988 km².

References

Municipalities in Mato Grosso do Sul